Nautique is an American boat manufacturer that produces boats primarily for waterskiing, wakeboarding and wakesurfing. With models in the Super Air Nautique and Ski Nautique lines, they are widely considered the gold standard in the inboard towboat market. Owned by parent company, Correct Craft, Nautique is a member of the oldest family-owned and operated boat manufacturer in the world.

Ski Nautique 
In 1961 Correct Craft released the original Ski Nautique, the first fiberglass ski boat of its kind designed by Leo Bentz. It was the world's first tournament inboard ski boat and paved the way for the modern day watersports boat.

Throughout the 60’s and 70’s, the Ski Nautique dominated the watersports boat market and was used in waterski shows and tournaments across the globe. In 1981, Nautique unveiled the Ski Nautique 2001. In 1986, SeaWorld signed a contract with Nautique to supply Ski Nautique boats for ski shows at their marine parks. During that same year the 25th anniversary of the Ski Nautique was released, called the Silver Nautique. The next iteration of the Ski Nautique was introduced in 1990 and by 1993 was switched over to fiberglass floor and stringer construction for increased durability. 1997 brought the Ski Nautique 196 with Total Surface Control (TSC) to the hull design for a customized wake for slalom, trick and jump skiers. Over the course of the next decade, Total Surface Control was developed into 2nd and 3rd generations until it was eventually phased out. The Ski Nautique 196 brought a new era to the waterski boat world as the reigning industry leader from 1997 until 2009.

In 2010, with the help of legendary waterskier and Team Nautique athlete Andy Mapple, the Ski Nautique 200 was released. This 3-event waterski boat is currently in production as the Ski Nautique 200 and is responsible for pulling 25 world records including Ryan Dodd's current jump record of 254 feet.

2019 brought the introduction of the current Ski Nautique. For the first time, Nautique introduced carbon fiber into the layers of the hull to drastically cut the weight of the boat while still keeping it strong.

Super Air Nautique 
In 1997 the first wakeboarding-specific boat was introduced by Nautique. The "Air Nautique" offered the very first manufacturer-supplied wakeboard tower with the Flight Control Tower® and also introduced internal ballast tanks as standard features. In 1999 Nautique changed the face of wakeboarding again with Total Wake Control (TWC) and later again in 2006 with HydroGate® that can change the shape of the wake on the fly. In 2007 Nautique brought a new speed control method into the watersports world called Zero-Off, a GPS-based system that maintains preset speeds. In 2012 Nautique completely changed the industry with the release of the Super Air Nautique G23. Nautique then developed two other G-Series models with the G21 and G25. In 2016, Nautique then blended what it learned with the Ski Nautique 200 and G-Series and created a multi-sport line called the GS-Series. These boats can be used to wakesurf, waterski or wakeboard. In 2019 Nautique released the Super Air Nautique G23 Paragon.

Nautique Surf System  
In 2013, Nautique started shifting their Super Air Nautiques to gear towards wakesurfers as well as wakeboarders and introduced the Nautique Surf System (NSS). The Nautique Surf System (NSS) consists of three major components: Ballast, Wave Plates, and fresh air exhaust system. The ballast tanks increase the weight of the boat while the waveplates redirect water to create a larger and smoother surf wave on either side of the boat. The exhaust is pointed downward directly in the water path of the propeller, this sends the carbon monoxide exhaust far behind the surfer that is riding behind the boat.

Events 
Nautique entered into an agreement with The Masters Water Ski Tournament in 1975 and continues to pull the event every year at Callaway Gardens in Pine Mountain, Georgia on Memorial Day weekend. The event originally included slalom, jump and trick waterskiing and has since added wakeboarding and wakeskating. Along with the Masters, Nautique is also the exclusive towboat for the WWA Wakeboard World Championships, the WWA US Wakeboard National Championships, the Moomba Masters, the Wake Open, and the IWWF Waterski World Championships

Models

210 and 230
The Super Air Nautique 210 and 230 are narrow body wake boats, they are distinguishable by their streamline hull and pointed bow. These boats are tailored more towards wakeboarding but also features the Nautique Surf System. The last year of 210 and 230 production was 2021.

G-series
The Super Air Nautique G-Series is a wide body boat designed to produce a larger surfing wake. The boat comes in 3 lengths all weighing above 5000 lbs. In 2022 the G-Series boat's full ballast weight became heavier than the Paragon model with the addition of supplemental ballast and a telescoping flight tower.

S-series
In August 2021 Nautique introduced a new line of boats with the S23. The boat reintroduces a pointed bow, a feature that was discontinued with the end of the 210 and 230. As of October 22, 2021 there are two available lengths, 23 and 21 feet. In June 2022 Nautique introduced a 25 foot version.

Paragon
The Super Air Nautique G23 Paragon was announced in 2019. It is the first boat Nautique has built that has a dry weight of over 7000 lbs. This boat is considered a more luxurious G-Series and also comes with increase performance. Added weight comes from telescoping flight tower and recliner seats positioned in the transom of the boat. The paragon also has a different prop from the traditional G-Series Models.

Manufacturing 
Nautique manufactures their Boats in Orlando Florida, their manufacturing facility included 2 private lakes used to test boats.
Nautique announced in January, 2021 that they will be increasing their manufacturing capabilities and workforce. To do this, the company purchased a 300,000 square-foot facility just down the road from their current manufacturing facilities.

Team Nautique

Wakeboarders
Noal Flegel
Danny Harf
 Mary Morgan Howell
Tony Iacconi
Rusty Malinoski
Jeff Mckee
Shaun Murray
Cory Teunissen

Wakesurfers
John Akerman
Jodi Grassman
Drew Drennan

Water Skiers 

 Josh Briant
 Ryan Dodd
 Pato Font
 Anna Gay
 Erika Lang
 Whitney McClintock
 Robert Pigozzi
 Neilly Ross
 Jon Travers

References 

Water sports equipment manufacturers
Motorboats
Towed water sports
Sporting goods manufacturers of the United States
Manufacturing companies established in 1997
American companies established in 1997